This is a list of notable recipients of the top two classes of the Order of Merit of the Federal Republic of Germany.

Grand Crosses Special Class of the Order of Merit of the Federal Republic of Germany

Presidents of the Federal Republic of Germany 
The president receives the Grand Cross Special Class ex officio.
 Karl Carstens
 Joachim Gauck
 Gustav Heinemann
 Roman Herzog
 Theodor Heuss
 Horst Köhler
 Heinrich Lübke
 Johannes Rau
 Walter Scheel
 Frank-Walter Steinmeier
 Richard von Weizsäcker
 Christian Wulff

Other Grand Crosses Special Class 
 Valdas Adamkus
 Isa bin Salman Al Khalifa
 Amha Selassie
 Ásgeir Ásgeirsson
 Azlan Shah of Perak
 Giovanni Gronchi
 Dalia Grybauskaitė
 Tarja Halonen
 Lennart Meri
 Václav Havel
 François Hollande
 Carlos Ibáñez del Campo
 Jaafar of Negeri Sembilan
 Andrej Kiska
 Theodor Körner
 Empress Kōjun
 Juscelino Kubitschek
 John Kufuor
 Aleksander Kwaśniewski
 Guðni Thorlacius Jóhannesson
 Rosen Plevneliev
 Manuel Prado Ugarteche
 Marc Ravalomanana
 Gustavo Rojas Pinilla
 Adolfo Ruiz Cortines
 Adolf Schärf
 Eduard Shevardnadze
 Luis Somoza Debayle
 Josip Broz Tito
 Ahmed Sékou Touré
 Héctor Trujillo
 Suharto
 Siti Hartinah

Grand Crosses Special Issue of the Order of Merit of the Federal Republic of Germany
 Konrad Adenauer
 Helmut Kohl

See also

References

 
Orders, decorations, and medals of Germany
Civil awards and decorations of Germany
Merit Of The Federal Republic Of Germany, Order of
Lists of German award winners